James Peter Edward Shaw (born 6 May 1973) is a New Zealand politician and a leader of the Green Party of Aotearoa New Zealand. Voters elected Shaw to the New Zealand parliament at the 2014 general election as a list representative of the Green Party. The party selected Shaw as its male co-leader in May 2015. Following Metiria Turei's resignation in August 2017, Shaw became the party's sole leader for the duration of the 2017 general election.

In October 2017 the Green Party agreed to support a Labour-led government. Shaw became the Minister of Statistics, Minister for Climate Change and Associate Minister of Finance (outside Cabinet). Following the 2020 general election, the Greens agreed to cooperate with the Labour majority government, and Shaw was re-appointed as the Minister for Climate Change.

Early life
Shaw was born in Wellington, and was primarily raised by his single mother Cynthia Shaw. When he was twelve years old his mother entered into a relationship with fellow teacher Susanne Jungersen. Shaw credits his two mothers for instilling him with his passion for politics and social justice. He attended Wellington High School (1985–1990) and Victoria University of Wellington. Shaw first tried his hand at politics in the 1992 Wellington local elections, standing for the Wellington City Council in the Western Ward on a Green ticket. He came seventh out of ten candidates. He later moved to London, living there for 12 years, before returning to New Zealand in 2010. Shaw completed an MSc in sustainability and business leadership at the University of Bath School of Management in 2005.

Career before politics
Before returning to Wellington in 2010, Shaw worked in the consulting division at PricewaterhouseCoopers. Between 2011 and 2014, Shaw worked as both a consultant for HSBC bank on "environmental awareness programmes for future leaders" and also at Wellington social enterprise the Akina Foundation.

Political career

At age 19, Shaw stood in the 1992 local elections in Wellington's Western ward. Three candidates were elected, with Shaw coming seventh of ten candidates.

He came third in the candidate vote after Labour and National, but second in the party vote, beating Labour into third place. He was 15th on the 2011 party list and the highest-placed candidate who did not make it into Parliament.

Shaw has said that in the 2011 Greens selection process, party members "didn't have a lot of time to get to know me" and disregarded him as "an ex-PWC management consultant in a suit". He says he has proved his worth to the party subsequently and was rewarded with a higher list ranking in both the draft and final party lists for the 2014 election.

Bryce Edwards said in The New Zealand Herald that Shaw represented "the more environmentally-focused, non-left side of the [Green] party – what might be called the New Greens faction – people who are more at home in the business world wearing corporate attire than amongst the far left. ... There will be many that see Shaw as a future co-leader of the party."

Shaw was elected to Parliament for the first time as a Green Party list MP in the 2014 general election and re-elected at the 2017 general election and 2020 general election. Shaw contested Wellington Central at each of those elections, placing third every time to Labour's Grant Robertson and National's Paul Foster-Bell (2014) and Nicola Willis (2017 and 2020).

Member of Parliament

First term in Parliament and ascension to leadership 
Shaw's first term in Parliament was the final term of the John Key and Bill English-led National Government. The Green Party, led by Russel Norman and Metiria Turei, was not part of the Government. Shaw was initially appointed as Green Party spokesperson for a selection of justice and business-related portfolios and made a member of the Justice and Electoral Committee.

Norman announced his retirement from the co-leadership position in January 2015, triggering a leadership contest. Despite having only been an MP for seven months, Shaw successfully contested the election against longer-serving MPs Kevin Hague and Gareth Hughes and extra-parliamentary candidate Vernon Tava. During the campaign, Shaw said that as co-leader he would try and connect with "the 28 per cent of voters that considered voting Green last year and didn’t and remove all of the barriers that are currently stopping them voting Green". At the election held at the Green Party AGM on 30 May 2015, Shaw won 54 per cent of the delegates' first preference votes, compared to Hague who won 44 per cent (the other two candidates both won 1 per cent).

The day after becoming co-leader, he called for a cross-party consensus on climate change and said there was room for the Greens and National to work together on the issue. He also said in his first major speech that he wanted the Green Party to be "more like modern New Zealand", and expand its membership both in terms of numbers and to include a more diverse group of people.

2017 general election 
The leadership pairing of Turei (a lawyer) and Shaw (a management consultant) pitched itself as a more mainstream, professional version of the party compared to previous incarnations which were associated with "being wacky, smoking dope, hugging trees and eating lentils." A Vanity Fair-style photoshoot presented the co-leaders alongside four new candidates on the cover of North & South magazine in May 2017. Despite this, the party launched "radical" policy reform to the New Zealand welfare system and tax system. In the policy announcement on 16 July, Turei admitted committing benefit fraud in the 1990s and later admitted to electoral fraud in the same period. Under pressure, she eventually resigned on 9 August, leaving Shaw as the Green Party's sole leader for the duration of the 2017 general election campaign.

As sole leader, Shaw relaunched the party's campaign in Auckland and a new slogan ("Love New Zealand") on 13 August. In September, Shaw launched the party's climate policy: a Zero Carbon Act with the goal of net zero carbon emissions by 2050, the establishment of an independent Climate Change Commission, and the replacement of the current New Zealand Emissions Trading Scheme with a Kiwi Climate Fund that pays an annual dividend of $250 to each New Zealander and is generated by taxing farmers for pollution.

The Green Party's share of the party vote dropped to 6.3%, resulting in eight MPs being elected. Possible government arrangements after the election included a National/Green government, a Labour/Green/New Zealand First government and a National/New Zealand First government. Shaw ruled out cooperating with the National Party. New Zealand First also negotiated with National but decided to form a coalition government with the Labour Party, with confidence and supply from the Green Party.

Coalition Government, 2017–2020

Shaw was appointed Minister of Statistics, Minister for Climate Change and Associate Minister of Finance (outside Cabinet) in the coalition government.

As Minister for Statistics, Shaw received criticism from National MP Nick Smith for the low response rate during the 2018 New Zealand census. Shaw attributed the lower response to a lack of Internet access particularly among the older generation.

In April 2018, Shaw as Minister for Climate Change expressed support for the Government's decision to end future gas and oil exploration, hailing it as the "nuclear-free moment of our generation." He also reiterated the Green Party's support for ending deep-sea oil and gas exploration, stating that "fossil fuels are not our future."

According to figures released by the Department of Internal Affairs, Shaw was the government minister to spend the most on air travel fares in late 2018. Shaw spent NZ$77,771 on international air travel fares during the period between October and December 2018 while Prime Minister Jacinda Ardern spent NZ$54,487 during that same period. Shaw clarified that these air travel fares had been spent on attending multiple international climate change conferences.

On 14 March 2019, Shaw was assaulted while walking to Parliament, sustaining a black eye and lacerations to his face. The attack was condemned by politicians from all sides of the political spectrum. Police confirmed that a 47-year-old man was arrested and charged with injuring with intent to injure in relation to the incident. During a press conference held the following day, Shaw expressed support for climate change school strikes held across the country calling for governments worldwide to take action on climate change. Shaw declined to give details about the assault, stating it was under police investigation.

On 8 May 2019, Shaw introduced the Climate Change Response (Zero Carbon) Amendment Bill into the New Zealand Parliament. The Bill subsequently passed its first reading on 22 May 2019.

In late August 2020, Shaw attracted criticism from the opposition National Party, school principals, teachers unions' and members of his own Green Party after he approved the allocation of NZ$11.7 million from the Government's $3 billion COVID-19 "shovel-ready" recovery fund to the private "Green School New Zealand" in Taranaki. This funding boost violated the Green Party's own policy of opposing state funding being allocated to private schools. Shaw had defended the decision, claiming it would have created 200 jobs and boosted the local economy. Former Green MPs Catherine Delahunty, Mojo Mathers and Sue Bradford criticised Shaw's decision as a betrayal of the Green Party's policies and principles.

According to Newshub, Shaw refused to sign the Government's NZ$3 billion "shovel-ready" infrastructure fund until the Green School in Taranaki was approved. On 1 September, Shaw apologised for approving the funding of the Green School, describing it as "an error of judgment." Shaw has also apologised to Green Party members in a Zoom call. Representatives of the school have reportedly approached the Crown to convert part or all of the Government's grant into a loan. On 3 September, the Education Minister Chris Hipkins disputed Shaw's claim that he had given verbal approval to the allocation of NZ$11.7 million to the private Green School in Taranaki. On 2 November, it was reported that the owners of the Green School had reached a settlement for the Government's NZ$11.7 million grant to be converted into a loan; a development that was welcomed by local principals.

Supporting the Labour Government, 2020–2023
Labour won an outright majority in the 2020 general election. Despite this, Labour and the Green Party agreed a "cooperation agreement" on 31 October 2020 that resulted in Shaw retaining the Climate Change portfolio and become Associate Minister for the Environment (Biodiversity).

At the 2021 party annual general meeting Shaw was challenged for the co-leadership by Dunedin climate activist and software developer, James Cockle. Cockle stated his unhappiness with the progress the Greens were making during the Parliamentary term and wanted the Greens to become a "major party" and cease being seen as "Labour's little helper" as was the case under the current leadership. Shaw responded, stating he was "quietly confident" he would be re-elected by party members. Shaw was overwhelmingly re-elected, winning 116 delegate votes with just four to Cockle.

In mid September 2021, Shaw attracted media attention after Prime Minister Ardern granted him and a team of nine diplomats spaces in the managed isolation and quarantine system to attend the upcoming 2021 United Nations Climate Change Conference summit in Glasgow. Shaw's planned trip to the Climate Change conference was criticised by National Party leader Judith Collins and ACT Party leader David Seymour for denying places to homeward bound New Zealanders seeking places in managed isolation.

Shaw was not reconfirmed by Green Party delegates in the annual party co-leadership confirmation in July 2022, triggering a leadership election. Shaw stated Ardern had confirmed that he would retain his position as Climate Change Minister regardless of any potential change to his leadership. Two days after the confirmation vote, Shaw announced that he would put himself forward to continue in the leadership role. On 10 September, Shaw was re-elected as Green Party co-leader by 142 (97%) of the 145 eligible delegates at the party's annual general meeting.

Political views
Shaw believes that the market can be reformed to incorporate sustainability within its normal operations. In an interview with the Aro Valley Valley Voice he put forward his views:

On 5 June 2020, Shaw and fellow co-leader Marama Davidson described United States President Donald Trump as racist in response to a question fielded by press gallery journalists in response to the protests triggered by the murder of George Floyd in late May 2020.

Personal life
Shaw and his wife Annabel live in Aro Valley.

Electoral history

Parliamentary elections

2011 election

Electorate (as at 26 November 2011): 48,316

2014 election

2017 election

2020 election

Local elections

1992 Wellington local elections

Leadership elections

2015 leadership election

2021 leadership election

References

External links

Profile at the Green Party
Profile at New Zealand Parliament website
Interview with James Shaw by Claire Browning

 

1973 births
Living people
Green Party of Aotearoa New Zealand MPs
Members of the New Zealand House of Representatives
New Zealand list MPs
Government ministers of New Zealand
Unsuccessful candidates in the 2011 New Zealand general election
Unsuccessful candidates in the 2008 New Zealand general election
People educated at Wellington High School, New Zealand
Victoria University of Wellington alumni
Alumni of the University of Bath
People from Wellington City
Green Party of Aotearoa New Zealand co-leaders
21st-century New Zealand politicians
Candidates in the 2017 New Zealand general election
Candidates in the 2020 New Zealand general election